Antonella Del Core (born 5 November 1980 in Naples, Italy) is an Italian professional volleyball player. She plays for Italy women's national volleyball team. She has competed in the 2004 and 2012 Summer Olympics. She won the Best Server award of the 2013–14 CEV Champions League and won the title with the Russian club Dinamo Kazan.

Career
Del Core won with the Russian club Dinamo Kazan the 2013–14 CEV Champions League held in Baku, Azerbaijan, defeating 3-0 the home owners Rabita Baku in the semifinals and 3-0 to the Turkish VakıfBank İstanbul in the final. She was awarded tournament Best Server.

Del Core won the 2014 FIVB Club World Championship gold medal playing with the Russian club Dinamo Kazan that defeated 3-0 the Brazilian Molico Osasco in the championship match.

She played with her national team at the 2014 World Championship. There her team ended up in fourth place after losing 2-3 to Brazil the bronze medal match.

Clubs
 Assid Ester Napoli (1997-1998)
 Club Italia (1998-1999)
 Er Volley Napoli (1999-2001)
 Robursport Volley Pesaro (2001-2006)
 Pallavolo Sirio Perugia (2006-2008)
 Volley Bergamo (2008-2010)
 Eczacıbaşı Istanbul (2010-2011)
 Fakel Novy Ourengoï (2011-2012)
 Zarechie Odintsovo (2012-2013)
 Dinamo Kazan (2013-2016)

Awards

Individuals
 2009-10 CEV Champions League "Best Receiver"
 2013-14 CEV Champions League "Best Server"
 2016 World Olympic qualification tournament "Best Outside Spiker"

Clubs
 2005–06 CEV Women's Challenge Cup— Champions, with Scavolini Pesaro
 2006–07 CEV Women's Challenge Cup— Champions, with Sirio Perugia
 2006–07 Italian Championship -  Champion, with Sirio Perugia
 2007 Italian Cup - Champion, with Sirio Perugia
 2007 Italian Supercup -  Champions, with Sirio Perugia
 2007–08 CEV Champions League— Champions, with Sirio Perugia
 2008 Italian Supercup— Runner-Up, with Volley Bergamo
 2008–09 CEV Champions League— Champions, with Volley Bergamo
 2009–10 CEV Champions League— Champions, with Volley Bergamo
 2010 Italian Cup— Runner-Up, with Volley Bergamo
 2010-11 Turkish Cup -  Champions, with Eczacıbaşı Istanbul
 2013 Russian Cup -  Runner-up, with Dinamo Kazan
 2013–14 CEV Champions League -  Champion, with Dinamo Kazan
 2013–14 Russian Championship -  Champions, with Dinamo Kazan
 2014 FIVB Club World Championship -  Champion, with Dinamo Kazan
 2014–15 Russian Championship -  Champions, with Dinamo Kazan

References

External links
 
 
 
 

1980 births
Italian women's volleyball players
Italian expatriate sportspeople in Turkey
Living people
People of Campanian descent
Olympic volleyball players of Italy
Volleyball players at the 2004 Summer Olympics
Volleyball players at the 2012 Summer Olympics
Volleyball players at the 2016 Summer Olympics